Foulerton's Brook is a tributary of the Passaic River in Roseland, New Jersey in the United States.

Foulerton's Brook was rerouted during the construction of Interstate 280 to run behind the Essex County Golf Facility.

See also 
 List of rivers of New Jersey

References 

Rivers of Essex County, New Jersey
Tributaries of the Passaic River
Rivers of New Jersey